Madonna and Child with Two Saints is a tempera on panel painting by Perugino, dating to around 1495. It is now in the Kunsthistorisches Museum in Vienna. The saint to the right is Catherine of Alexandria, whilst the saint to the left is unidentified but may be Rose of Viterbo or Mary Magdalene.

Bibliography (in Italian)
Vittoria Garibaldi, Perugino, in Pittori del Rinascimento, Scala, Florence, 2004 
Pierluigi De Vecchi, Elda Cerchiari, I tempi dell'arte, volume 2, Bompiani, Milan, 1999. 
Stefano Zuffi, Il Quattrocento, Electa, Milan, 2004. 

Paintings of the Madonna and Child by Pietro Perugino
Paintings in the collection of the Kunsthistorisches Museum
1490s paintings
Perugino
Perugino